Top Gear is a 2022 Indian Telugu-language action thriller directed by Shashikanth and starring Aadi Saikumar and Riya Suman.

Cast 
Aadi Saikumar as Arjun 
Riya Suman as Aadhya 
Brahmaji as Brahmaji
Mime Gopi as Siddharth 
Shatru as ACP Vikram 
Satyam Rajesh as Rajesh

Reception 
A critic from The Times of India wrote that "Director Sashikanth and Aadi Saikumar pull off an engaging thriller filled with guns and gangsters". A critic from OTT Play wrote that "Director Shashikanth’s edge-of-the-seat screenplay is backed by solid efforts from the technical crew, apt casting and has impressive performances".

References